Guraleus deshayesii is a species of sea snail, a marine gastropod mollusk in the family Mangeliidae.

Description
The length of the oblong, subfusiform, dirty white shell varies between 10 mm and 51 mm. The whorls are slightly subangulate. The longitudinal ribs are crossed by raised transverse striae. The aperture is oblong. The outer lip is incrassate and covered with transverse marks and marked with a red spot.

Distribution
This marine species occurs off Fiji and Japan.

References

External links
  Tucker, J.K. 2004 Catalog of recent and fossil turrids (Mollusca: Gastropoda). Zootaxa 682:1–1295.
 

deshayesii
Gastropods described in 1860